Mueang Chachoengsao, formerly named the Mueang Paet Rio District (Thai: เมืองแปดริ้ว), is the capital district (amphoe mueang) of Chachoengsao province, Eastern Thailand.

History
Mueang Chachoengsao district was established in 1896. The present district office is close to the bank of the Bang Pakong River in Na Mueang subdistrict.

Geography
Neighboring districts are (from the north clockwise): Bang Nam Priao, Khlong Khuean, Bang Khla, Ban Pho of Chachoengsao Province; Bang Bo of Samut Prakan province; Lat Krabang and Nong Chok of Bangkok.

The important water resource are the Bang Pakong River and Khlong Nakhon Nueang Khet.

Administration

Central administration 
Mueang Chachoengsao is divided into 19 subdistricts (tambons), which are further subdivided into 192 administrative villages (mubans).

Local administration 
There is one town (thesaban mueang) in the district:
 Chachoengsao consisting of subdistrict Na Mueang.

There is one subdistrict municipality (thesaban tambon) in the district:
 Nakhon Nueang Khet consisting of parts of subdistrict Khlong Nakhon Nueang Khet.

There are 18 subdistrict administrative organizations (SAO) in the district:
 Tha Khai consisting of subdistrict Tha Khai.
 Ban Mai consisting of subdistrict Ban Mai.
 Khlong Na consisting of subdistrict Khlong Na.
 Bang Tin Pet consisting of subdistrict Bang Tin Pet.
 Bang Phai consisting of subdistrict Bang Phai.
 Khlong Chuk Krachoe consisting of subdistrict Khlong Chuk Krachoe.
 Bang Kaeo consisting of subdistrict Bang Kaeo.
 Bang Khwan consisting of subdistrict Bang Khwan.
 Khlong Nakhon Nueang Khet consisting of parts of subdistrict Khlong Nakhon Nueang Khet.
 Wang Takhian consisting of subdistrict Wang Takhian.
 Sothon consisting of subdistrict Sothon.
 Bang Phra consisting of subdistrict Bang Phra.
 Bang Kahai consisting of subdistrict Bang Kahai.
 Nam Daeng consisting of subdistrict Nam Daeng.
 Khlong Preng consisting of subdistrict Khlong Preng.
 Khlong Udom Chonlachon consisting of subdistrict Khlong Udom Chonlachon.
 Khlong Luang Phaeng consisting of subdistrict Khlong Luang Phaeng.
 Bang Toei consisting of subdistrict Bang Toei.

References

External links
 Mueang Chachoengsao district history(Thai)

Mueang Chachoengsao